Gavin Merrick Long  (31 May 1901 – 10 October 1968) was an Australian journalist and military historian. He was the general editor of the official history series Australia in the War of 1939–1945 and the author of three of its 22 volumes.

Early life
Gavin Long was born in Foster, Victoria, the eldest of six children of George Merrick Long, a clergyman. He was educated at Trinity Grammar School where his father was headmaster, and All Saints College, Bathurst.

Long completed a Bachelor of Arts degree at the University of Sydney in 1922 and worked as a teacher in 1922 and 1923. After working as a jackeroo in 1924 Long travelled to England in 1925 so that he could marry Mary Jocelyn Britten. During his time in England he worked at Australia House and was married on 5 September 1925. Two weeks after their marriage Long and his wife returned to Australia.

Journalist
After his return to Australia, Long worked as a journalist and moved between several newspapers. In 1930 he was made a senior reporter at the Melbourne Argus but was later reduced in rank due to the impact of the Great Depression on the paper. He was appointed a sub-editor at The Sydney Morning Herald in July 1931 and held this job until he was posted to the Herald'''s London office in 1938.

After the outbreak of the Second World War, Long was a correspondent to the British Expeditionary Force in France and was evacuated from Boulogne in May 1940. In November 1940, he was sent to Egypt where he reported on the 6th Australian Division during its campaigns in North Africa and Greece. Long was recalled to Australia in mid-1941 where he continued writing on defence matters.

Military historian

In March 1943 Long was appointed general editor of the Australia in the War of 1939–1945, a 22-volume official history of Australia's involvement in the Second World War, on the recommendation of C.E.W. Bean, the editor of the Official History of Australia in the War of 1914–1918. Based at the Australian War Memorial in Canberra, he spent the remainder of the war planning the series and visiting forward areas to interview members of the Australian military.

After the war Long played a key role in the official history project. As well as providing guidance to the other authors, he wrote three of the volumes in the series (To Benghazi (published 1952), Greece, Crete and Syria (1953) and The Final Campaigns (1963). He retired as general editor in 1963 as the project was nearing completion and he did not believe that a full-time editor was required. Long's books were well received by reviewers and his close involvement with the other authors gave the series a unity of purpose and method. Long was appointed an Officer of the Order of the British Empire in 1953 for his services as editor of the official history. In 1956 he was awarded the Greek Gold Cross of the Royal Order of the Phoenix.

Long continued to write after his retirement from the official history project. He was a research fellow with the Australian Dictionary of Biography, was part of the team which produced the Australian Government's Style Guide and contributed over 90 articles to The Canberra Times. He also wrote two further military history books, MacArthur as Military Commander (published in 1969) and The Six Years War (1973), which was a concise summary of Australia's involvement in the Second World War. The Six Years War'' was written well before it was published, but its publication was delayed while the final volumes in the official history series were completed.

Long died of lung cancer on 10 October 1968 at his home in Deakin, Australian Capital Territory, and was cremated.

Notes

References

 
 
 
 

1901 births
1968 deaths
Australian people of World War II
Officers of the Order of the British Empire
Historians of World War II
Deaths from lung cancer
Gold Crosses of the Order of the Phoenix (Greece)
20th-century Australian historians
People educated at Trinity Grammar School, Kew
People from Foster, Victoria
Australian military historians
20th-century Australian journalists
The Argus (Melbourne) people
The Sydney Morning Herald people
Deaths from cancer in the Australian Capital Territory